Bezos is a surname. It most commonly refers to Jeff Bezos (born 1964), an American entrepreneur, industrialist, media proprietor, investor, and the former chief executive officer of Amazon.

Other notable people with the surname include:

 Giannis Bezos (born 1956), Greek actor, director and comedian 
 MacKenzie Scott (formerly MacKenzie Scott Bezos; born 1970), American novelist, philanthropist, and the ex-wife of Jeff Bezos
 Mark Bezos (born 1968), American businessman, investor and commercial astronaut; brother of Jeff Bezos